The hundredweight (abbreviation: cwt), formerly also known as the centum weight or quintal, is a British imperial and US customary unit of weight or mass. Its value differs between the US and British imperial systems. The two values are distinguished in American English as the "short" and "long" hundredweight and in British English as the "cental" and the "imperial hundredweight".

Under both conventions, there are 20 hundredweight in a ton, producing a "short ton" of 2,000 pounds and a "long ton" of 2,240 pounds.

History
The hundredweight has had many values. In England in around 1300, different "hundreds" (centum in Medieval Latin) were defined. The Weights and Measures Act 1835 formally established the present imperial hundredweight of 112 lb.

The United States and Canada came to use the term "hundredweight" to refer to a unit of 100 lb. This measure was specifically banned from British use—upon risk of being sued for fraud—by the Weights and Measures Act 1824 but in 1879 the measure was legalised under the name "cental" in response to legislative pressure from British merchants importing wheat and tobacco from the United States.

Use

The short hundredweight is commonly used in the US in the sale of livestock and some cereal grains and oilseeds, paper, and concrete additives and on some commodities in futures exchanges.

A few decades ago, commodities weighed in terms of long hundredweight included cattle, cattle fodder, fertilizers, coal, some industrial chemicals, other industrial materials, and so on. However, since increasing metrication in most English-speaking countries, it is now less used. Church bell ringers use the unit commonly, although church bell manufacturers are increasingly moving over to the metric system.

Older blacksmiths' anvils are often stamped with a three-digit number indicating their total weight in hundredweight, quarter-hundredweight (28 lb, abbreviated qr), and pounds. Thus, an anvil stamped "1.1.8" will weigh 148 lb (112 lb + 28 lb + 8 lb).

The Imperial hundredweight is used as a measure of vehicle weight in the Bailiwick of Guernsey. It was also previously used to indicate the maximum recommended carrying load of vans and trucks, such as the Ford Thames 5 and 7 cwt vans and the 8, 15, 30 and 60 cwt Canadian Military Pattern trucks.

Europe 
In Europe outside British Isles, a centum or quintal was never defined in terms of British units. Instead, it was based on the kilogramme or former customary units. It is usually abbreviated q. It was 50 kg in Germany, 48.95 kg in France, 56 kg in Austria, etc. The unit was phased out or metricized after the introduction of the metric system in the 1790s, being occasionally retained in informal use up to mid-20th century.

See also
 Avoirdupois system
 The short and long hundred of 100 and 120, respectively
 Hundred, the medieval unit of measure
 Glossary of British ordnance terms#cwt

References 

Units of mass
Imperial units
Customary units of measurement in the United States